Johnmar Villaluna (born July 20, 1994 in Antipolo, Rizal), professionally known as OhMyV33Nus, is a Filipino Mobile Legends: Bang Bang player. He plays as a mid laner for Blacklist International. He has also played for ONIC Philippines.

Early life
Johnmar Villaluna was born on July 20, 1994, in Antipolo, Rizal. In his early years he often played video games for around 12 hours on average. As his family back then did not own a personal computer, he would often frequent internet cafés. His mother is an Overseas Filipino Worker in Japan and lived alongside with his grandfather and grandmother. Both her grandparents and mother had negative perception on gaming.

He started playing role-playing games such as Ragnarok at age 13. He then shifted to playing WarCraft and Dota, when informal tournaments centering around these types of games became popular. Villaluna at a young age decided he would want to pursue a career in gaming. He started mobile gaming sometime between the period when he was 17 to 19 years old playing games such as League of Legends (LoL).

Career

Early years
Villaluna would play mobile gaming casually for seven years and attempted to kickstart his career as professional esports player but to no avail. He also started to look for employment and take up a regular job which is somehow still related to gaming. In 2018, he decided to quit gaming altogether, intending to join his mother in Japan. While waiting for his visa application to get approved, he took up the title Mobile Legends: Bang Bang around the time MPL Philippines Season 3 just recently concluded. He, his friends in Facebook, and some former players of League of Legends gathered to form a team which competed in minor level tournaments like inter-barangay leagues. The team was successful and able to win a good amount of prize money which led Villaluna to reconsider his plans to give up gaming. He was eventually able to join his first professional team ONIC Philippines. He would be known as "OhMyV33Nus", his game handle and be also known under the moniker "The Queen" by his fans.

ONIC Philippines
Villaluna made his MPL Philippines professional scene debut during MPL Philippines Season 4 with ONIC Philippines. This would also begin the development of the “Royal” Duo of he and Danerie James “Wise.” Del Rosario.

Upon debuting, Villaluna had a successful campaign with ONIC Philippines, finishing and securing a Grand Finals position during Season 4’s Grand Finals. There they would meet the team Sunsparks. Despite holding a 2-1 lead over Sunsparks, due to both miscommunication and excellent defense possessed by the opponent, Sunsparks was able to defeat ONIC in a reverse sweep.

Villaluna would opt to stay with ONIC for Seasons 5 and 6. Season 5 in particular, a rematch was drawn between ONIC and Sunsparks in the Grand Finals, however, Sunsparks was able to defeat ONIC once again giving them the Championship for Season 5 and making them the first team to win back-to-back titles for MPL Philippines.

During an interview with Tryke Gutierrez, he expressed that during the time that ONIC Philippines was considering releasing both he and Del Rosario, he would have opted to go for a streaming career rather than playing against Del Rosario for different teams. This was later confirmed in a separate interview from Del Rosario made by Gutierrez himself. Furthermore, he insisted that Del Rosario should continue his career in professional esports while he stayed in the backlines cheering for his upcoming career.

Blacklist International
Villaluna was then traded alongside with Del Rosario to Blacklist International in return for FULLCLIP (now known as Kairi) during the offseason for MPL Philippines Season 7. There, he and Del Rosario would team up with young rookies in "Edward" Dapadap and Kiel Calvin “OHEB” Soriano, and veteran Jason “ESON” Gerardo.

Villaluna was named as the Team Captain of Blacklist International and he led the team to having a 12-1 regular season finish. Villaluna, alongside Del Rosario, Soriano, Dapadap and Gerardo, led Blacklist to their first Finals Appearance against Execration. Despite going down to a 3-1 series deficit, through unexpected picks and affirmation of draft picks and bans, Blacklist was able to reverse sweep Execration and win their first title since debuting with Blacklist in seven games.

Despite falling short of the MSC 2021 title and MPLI title in the same year, Villaluna was able to clinch his second MPL Philippines Title with Blacklist International, facing off against his former team ONIC Philippines in a 4-1 series victory. Villaluna was given the second chance to represent the Philippines in the MLBB M3 World Championships in Singapore. Despite beginning with a rough start during the playoffs, Villaluna led the team alongside the dominating performances of the team itself through the lower-brackets to secure the first world title, sweeping ONIC Philippines in the Grand Finals.

After winning their first World Championship Title, Villaluna, alongside Del Rosario, announced that they will be skipping MPL Philippines Season 9 to rest after continuous victories in international events. However, they later affirmed that they will be representing the Philippines in the upcoming 2021 Southeast Asian Games. Villaluna proceeded to win the Gold Medal alongside Del Rosario, Imam (also known as Haji), and their two rookies in Gonzales and Sotto. 

Villaluna returned under Blacklist International for MPL Philippines Season 10 where he proceeded to lead the team to a 9-5 record in the regular season. Villaluna was then named as the regular season MVP for Season 10 and where he proceeded to clinch his third championship title in two years. 

Villaluna was also among the eleven new inductees of the MPL Philippines Hall of Legends. Villaluna is joined by his royal duo, Wise Del Rosario.

Personal life
OhMyV33Nus identifies as a member of the LGBT community. He has been subjected to homophobia as a player but has openly used his identity to represent the LGBT community in esports. He is in a relationship with teammate Wise with the latter describing the former as his "love of my life".

Career performance and tournament results

References

LGBT esports players
Filipino esports players
Competitors at the 2021 Southeast Asian Games
Filipino LGBT sportspeople
Southeast Asian Games gold medalists for the Philippines
People from Antipolo